Kinoe no Komatsu ('Young Pines' or 'Pine Seedlings on the First Rat Day'), published in three volumes in 1814, is a woodblock-printed book of shunga erotica by Hokusai made within the ukiyo-e genre.

Description 
The series consists of three books, each of 30 pages, first published in 1814. Each books starts with an okubi-e print of a courtesan; next there are 7 spreads of erotic scenes, and ends with close-up pictures of genitalia.

Narratives 

Kinoe no komatsu has two types of narrative. One continuous narrative is about the sexual life of Hanada Umenosuke, and it links all three volumes together. In Volume I he gets involved in a sexual relationship with his aunt's son-in-law's daughter Tamami Oiso. In Volume II, the couple get involved with Tamami Oiso's maid, and in Volume III, Hanada Umenosuke becomes a practising acupuncturist and treats both a man and a woman. A second type of narrative that fills the empty space alongside the imaged tells about the activities depicted.

The Dream of the Fisherman's Wife 

Illustrations in the albums are views of partially naked couples. The larger of the two mollusks performs cunnilingus on her, while the smaller one, his offspring, assists by fondling the woman's mouth and left nipple. The surrounding text express their mutual sexual pleasure from the encounter.

Scholar Danielle Talerico notes that the image would have recalled to the minds of contemporary viewers the story of Princess Tamatori, highly popular in the Edo period. In this story, Tamatori is a modest shell diver who marries Fujiwara no Fuhito of the Fujiwara clan, who is searching for a pearl stolen from his family by Ryūjin, the dragon god of the sea. Vowing to help, Tamatori dives down to Ryūjin's undersea palace of Ryūgū-jō, and is pursued by the god and his army of sea creatures, including octopuses. She cuts open her own breast and places the jewel inside; this allows her to swim faster and escape, but she dies from her wound soon after reaching the surface.

Analysis 

Scholar Mihashi Osamu examined shunga art and particularly Hokusai's prints from Kinoe no Komatsu. He identified four typical features of depicted men that show their "evil appearance":
a hairy body, a large nose and broad face (or head, and sometimes thick lips), dark skin, and a closed foreskin (phimosis). In Katsushika Hokusai's Kinoe no komatsu (1814), a mochi maker who speaks like a complete provincial is attacking a young woman. The man's nose is unappealingly large, and his penis shows signs of phimosis, meeting two of the qualifications for an evil appearance. The young woman is calling him "filthy" (kitanarashii) and openly expressing her physical disgust. Her genitals are firmly closed, and she shows no sign of welcoming him. In fact, reading the inscribed dialogue one learns that a neighbor heard her screams and hurried to the scene, surprising the attacker and allowing the young woman to escape.

The man's evil appearance foretells his failure to have sex with the woman, and that is the outcome, due to her rejection and defiance; for this reason the scene may be considered to fall within the realm humor. However, if so, this would be laughter ruled by a masculine point of view. And in fact not all evil rape scenes end in failure and the ridicule of a worthless man.

Gallery

Further reading 

 Jack Hillier, The Art of Hokusai in Book Illustration (London: Sotheby Parke-Bernet Publications; Berkeley: University of California Press, 1980), pp. 170–71.
 Jack Hillier, The Art of the Japanese Book,  2 vols. (New York: Sotheby's Publications, 1987), pp. 894–99.
 Danielle Talerico, "Interpreting Sexual Imagery in Japanese Prints: A Fresh Approach to Hokusai’s Diver and Two Octopi", Impressions, no. 23 (2001), pp. 24–41.

References

Sources

External links 

 Full three volumes of Kinoe no komatsu

Shunga
Sexuality in Japan
History of art in Japan
Hokusai
Works by Hokusai